The Remixes is a compilation album by English rock band The Stone Roses. It was released in 2000 and features remixes by various producers including Utah Saints and Paul Oakenfold.

Track listing
 "Shoot You Down" (The Soul Hooligan remix) - 4:47
 "Fools Gold" (Top Won mix) - remixed by A Guy Called Gerald - 7:12
 "Made of Stone" (808 State mix) - 4:58
 "Waterfall" (12" remix) - remixed by Paul Oakenfold & Steve Osborne - 5:35
 "One Love" (Utah Saints remix) - 5:01
 "I Wanna Be Adored" (Bloody Valentine edit) - remixed by Rabbit in the Moon - 7:40
 "Fools Gold" (Grooverider's mix) - 6:05
 "I Am the Resurrection" (Jon Carter remix) - 7:02
 "Waterfall" (Justin Robertson's mix) - 6:20
 "She Bangs the Drums" (Elephant remix) - 6:18
 "Elizabeth My Dear" (Kinobe remix) - 4:53
 "Elephant Stone" (Mint Royale remix) – 3:28

References

External links

The Remixes at YouTube (streamed copy where licensed)

The Stone Roses albums
Albums produced by John Leckie
Albums produced by Martin Hannett
2000 remix albums
2000 compilation albums